Mount Darwin may refer to:

 Mount Darwin (Andes), mountain in the Andes Mountains in Chile
 Mount Darwin (Antarctica)
 Mount Darwin (California)
 Mount Darwin (Tasmania)
 Mount Darwin (New Zealand), a mountain of New Zealand
 Mount Darwin, Zimbabwe, a town in Zimbabwe

See also
 Darwin (disambiguation)
 Darwin Mountains, mountain range in Antarctica
 Darwin (volcano), a volcano on the Galápagos Islands